Tai Phake may refer to:

Tai Phake language
Tai Phake people